The Bogoliubov Prize is an international award offered by the Joint Institute for Nuclear Research (JINR) to scientists with outstanding contribution to theoretical physics and applied mathematics. The award is issued in the memory of the theoretical physicist and mathematician Nikolay Bogoliubov.

Laureates
1996 Anatoly Logunov (Russia) — for a generous contribution to quantum field theory.
1996 Chen Ning Yang (United States) — for a generous contribution to the elementary particle physics.
1999 Viktor Baryahtar (Ukraine) and Ilya Prigogine (Belgium) — for their significant achievements in theoretical physics.
2001–2002 Albert Tavchelidze (Georgia and Russia) and Yoichiro Nambu (USA) — for their contribution to the theory of color charge of quarks.
2006 Vladimir Kadyshevsky  (JINR and Moscow State University, Russia).
2006–2008 Borys Paton and Dmitry Shirkov (JINR)
2014 Valery Rubakov and Marc Henneaux
 2019 Dmitry Igorevich Kazakov and Đàm Thanh Sơn

See also

 List of physics awards

References
JINR Awards 

Physics awards
Physics education in Russia
Russian science and technology awards